Lacrizeomic' (pron. "La Crise au Mic" ) is the second studio album by French Marseille-based hip hop artist Jul and his follow-up to his debut album Dans ma paranoïa. It was released on the independent label Liga One Industry / Musicast on 16 June 2014 just four months after the release of the debut album on 24 February 2014. The 18-track album contains three collaborations with other artists, namely GP, Houari and Saiah, and three artists on the label, who had appeared in Paranoïa being Kalif, Soso Maness and Kamikaze return with their separate tracks (16 to 18).

Track list
"Anti BDH" (3:14)
"Ça veut ton cash" (2:43)
"Briganté" (3:20)
"Je profite" (2:02)
"Loin" (feat. GP) (4:41)
"L'histoire" (3:37)
"N'imite pas" (3:24)
"On survit (feat. Houari) (3:26)
"Posé à la place 2" (feat. Saiah) (4:46)
"Pour un rien" (3:59)
"Regardes pas de travers" (3:17)
"Ça me dégoûte" (3:46)
"Sens interdit" (3:46)
"T'as coulé" (4:53)
"Terter" (feat. Font-Vert) (4:59)
"Au top" by Kalif (3:33)
"On squatte le béton" by Kamikaz (4:04)
"Neymar" by Soso Maness (3:37)

Charts

Weekly charts

Year-end charts

References

2014 albums
French-language albums